12P may refer to:

 12P/Pons-Brooks, a comet in the Solar System
 Noon
 Pallister-Killian syndrome or Tetrasomy 12p
 The Piaget 12P, a slim automatic watch movement.

See also
 P12 (disambiguation)

ja:12P